Penelope Riboldi (2 July 1986) is an Italian football forward, currently playing for Pink Bari of Italy's Serie A.

She was the third top scorer of the 2010–11 season with 19 goals while playing for UPC Tavagnacco, with whom she played in the 2011–12 Champions League, scoring a winner over LdB Malmö.

References

External links
 
 Profile at Football.it

1986 births
Living people
Italian women's footballers
Serie A (women's football) players
A.S.D. AGSM Verona F.C. players
U.P.C. Tavagnacco players
Women's association football forwards
Atalanta Mozzanica Calcio Femminile Dilettantistico players
A.S.D. Pink Sport Time players
S.S.D. Napoli Femminile players
Pomigliano C.F. players
Roma Calcio Femminile players
Footballers from Brescia